Thespis is a genus of mantis in the family Thespidae.

The following species are recognised in the genus Thespis:
 Thespis bicolor Chopard, 1913
 Thespis dissimilis Westwood, 1889
 Thespis exposita Beier, 1963
 Thespis major Giglio-Tos, 1916
 Thespis media Giglio-Tos, 1916
 Thespis metae Hebard, 1922
 Thespis parva Drury, 1773

See also
List of mantis genera and species

References

Thespidae
Mantodea genera
Taxa named by Jean Guillaume Audinet-Serville